Brandie Wilkerson (born July 1, 1992) is a Canadian beach volleyball player who plays as a right-side blocker. With teammate Heather Bansley, she achieved a career-high world ranking of No. 1 in November 2018. She is the 2018 FIVB Best Blocker. She has also competed on the AVP.

Early life
Wilkerson was born in Switzerland and moved to Canada when she was seven. Her father Herb Johnson, né Wilkerson, is a former basketball player who was drafted by the Cleveland Cavaliers of the National Basketball Association. He played professionally in France, Spain, Japan, Turkey, and Switzerland. Her mother, Stephanie, was a Swiss national runner and a two-time Ironman finalist.

University career
Wilkerson played CIS volleyball for the York Lions from 2010 to 2014. For the 2010–11 season, she was named York's female rookie of the year and was the OUA rookie of the year in women's volleyball. In 2011–12, Wilkerson was named an OUA first-team all-star and was a CIS second-team All-Canadian as she led the OUA with 4.29 points scored per set. She repeated the OUA and CIS awards won in the 2012–13 season and finished with 4.21 points per set and 3.36 kills per set. In her senior year in 2013–14, she was limited to 11 matches due to an injury, but was still named an OUA East second-team all-star while ranking fourth in the OUA with 3.91 points per set.

International career
Wilkerson and Bansley first competed together at the Swatch World Tour finals in Toronto (Sepembert 13–18, 2016), where they finished 9th. In 2018, they had a break-out year and closed the season ranked No. 1 on the FIVB world tour. 

Wilkerson and Bansley were named as part of the Canadian Olympic team for the 2020 Summer Olympics in Tokyo, one of the nation's two entries in the women's tournament along with the team of Bansley's former partner Sarah Pavan and Melissa Humana-Paredes.  Bansley and Wilkerson struggled during pool play, recording two losses and one win, but advanced into the knockout stages due to being one of the top two "Lucky Loser" teams. In the Round of 16 they were the sixteenth seed, but unexpectedly upset the third-seeded American team of Claes/Sponcil by winning two sets to one. In the quarter final they faced the Latvian team Kravčenoka/Graudiņa, and were eliminated after losing two sets to one.

References

External links
 
 
 

1992 births
Living people
Canadian women's beach volleyball players
Beach volleyball blockers
Sportspeople from Lausanne
Volleyball players from Toronto
York Lions volleyball players
Beach volleyball players at the 2020 Summer Olympics
Black Canadian sportspeople
Canadian people of African-American descent
Canadian people of Swiss-French descent
Naturalized citizens of Canada
Swiss people of African-American descent
Swiss emigrants to Canada